Mohaka is a small settlement in the northern Hawke's Bay region of the eastern North Island of New Zealand. It is located on the coast of Hawke Bay, 20 kilometres southwest of Wairoa.

The Mohaka River reaches the coast close to Mohaka.

Marae

Mohaka has two tribal meeting grounds for the iwi of Ngāti Pāhauwera, and the Ngāti Kahungunu hapū of Kurahikakawa: Waiapapa-a-Iwi Mohaka Marae and Te Kahu O Te Rangi meeting house, and Waihua or Kurahikakawa Marae.

In October 2020, the Government committed $1,949,075 from the Provincial Growth Fund to upgrade the two marae and 22 other Ngāti Kahungunu marae, creating 164 jobs.

Education

Mohaka School is a Year 1-8 co-educational state primary school.

References

Wairoa District
Populated places in the Hawke's Bay Region
Populated places around Hawke Bay